Anixia berkeleyi is a species of fungus belonging to the Anixia genus. It was discovered 1927 by Russian mycologist Nikolai Aleksandrovich Naumov.

References 

Agaricomycetes
Fungi described in 1927